Laurel C. Broten (born  1967) is a former politician in Ontario, Canada. She was a Liberal member of the Legislative Assembly of Ontario from 2003 to 2013, who represented the Toronto riding of Etobicoke—Lakeshore. She served in the cabinets of Kathleen Wynne and Dalton McGuinty.

Background
Prior to entering politics, she was a lawyer, community activist and volunteer. Broten attended McMaster University from 1986 to 1990, and has both a Bachelor of Arts and a Bachelor of Science degree from the institution. She also received an LL.B. from the University of Western Ontario in 1993. She was a law clerk to Madam Justice Claire L'Heureux-Dubé at the Supreme Court of Canada from 1993 to 1994, and later had a practice in civil and commercial litigation. She has also served as chair of the board of directors for the Gatehouse, a community centre for survivors of child abuse.

Broten, her husband, and their two children moved to Halifax, Nova Scotia in 2013.

Provincial politics
Broten ran for the Ontario legislature in the provincial election of 1999, but was defeated by Progressive Conservative Morley Kells in Etobicoke-Lakeshore by 5,156 votes. She ran again in the 2003 election, and defeated Kells by 6,722 votes amid a provincial shift to the Liberals.

38th Legislative Assembly
On October 23, 2003, she was named as the Parliamentary Assistant to Premier Dalton McGuinty. In this role she conducted province-wide consultations to develop meaningful reforms to address domestic violence in Ontario. This led to the Government's Domestic Violence Action Plan which included a groundbreaking public education campaign. She also chaired the Premier's Shared Air Summit, which drew scientists and policy makers from across North America to tackle the linked issues of smog and transboundary air pollution.

She introduced two private member bills in 2004. The first, entitled Kids First Licences Act, proposed to allow drivers to make charitable donations to children's charities whenever they renewed their vehicle licence. The second, called Workplace Violence and Workplace Harassment (an amendment to the Occupational Health and Safety Act), proposed to impose additional duties and responsibilities in workplaces.

On June 29, 2005, Broten was appointed to cabinet as Minister of the Environment. As minister, she developed policies under one of Canada's most comprehensive Climate Change Plans in an effort to reduce greenhouse gas emissions. She also introduced the Clean Water Act designed to better safeguard Ontario's drinking water.

39th Legislative Assembly
Broten was re-elected in 2007, and was appointed Parliamentary Assistant to the Minister of Health and Long-Term Care. While there, she authored a report detailing a Five Point Action Plan to create more opportunities and reduce barriers for internationally trained doctors in Ontario. Her report formed the basis for new legislation in 2008.

In 2008, she introduced legislation that imposes a duty to report images of child abuse. The following year she unanimously passed a resolution calling for a review of reporting standards for listed companies.

In 2009, Broten was appointed Parliamentary Assistant to the Minister of Energy and Infrastructure. On October 7 that year, she was appointed Minister of Children and Youth Services and Minister Responsible for Women's Issues.

40th Legislative Assembly
In 2011, Broten was re-elected again. Premier Dalton McGuinty reorganized his cabinet and appointed her as Minister of Education and minister responsible for women's issues.

On February 11, 2013, following a long battle with teachers' unions, Premier Kathleen Wynne appointed her as Minister of Intergovernmental Affairs. Laurel resigned from the cabinet and the legislature on July 2, 2013.

On June 23, 2013, Broten announced that she would be "leaving politics effective July 2nd" and moving to Halifax, Nova Scotia.

Cabinet positions

Electoral record

Post-political career
After she resigned from the Ontario Cabinet and legislature, Broten and her family eventually settled in Hammonds Plains, Nova Scotia. She had initially stated that she was moving to Halifax, for her husband Paul obtained a job at Emera as special counsel for senior projects.

Not long after Nova Scotia Premier Stephen McNeil's Liberal Party swept to electoral victory, she was hired as a government consultant to lead a comprehensive review of the taxation in the province. Her final report, released on November 19, 2014, made 22 recommendations on taxation; these included eliminating the tax bracket for high-income ($150,000 and over) earners, eliminating refundable tax credits, eliminating a tax rebate for seniors, reducing corporate taxes for large businesses, introducing a carbon tax and expanding the HST to include numerous exempt products including books, children's clothes, diapers, and feminine hygiene products. Broten's report was generally panned, and Nova Scotia Finance Minister Diana Whalen subsequently scheduled several public consultations across the province in the winter of 2015. On March 25, 2015, Whalen said "every recommendation in the Broten review is [being] looked at", including a carbon tax, but only explicitly ruled out increasing the HST on books and eliminating a volunteer firefighter tax credit.

On January 14, 2015, Broten was selected by the Nova Scotia Business Incorporated (NSBI) board to the position of President and CEO of NSBI. Her initial salary was comparable to that of her predecessor, Stephen Lund.

References

External links
 

1969 births
Women government ministers of Canada
Clerks of the Supreme Court of Canada
Living people
McMaster University alumni
Members of the Executive Council of Ontario
Ontario Liberal Party MPPs
People from Etobicoke
Politicians from Toronto
Women in Nova Scotia politics
Women MPPs in Ontario
University of Western Ontario alumni
Western Law School alumni
21st-century Canadian politicians
21st-century Canadian women politicians